Applause is a 1929 American pre-Code black-and-white backstage musical talkie directed by Rouben Mamoulian and starring Helen Morgan, Jack Cameron, and Joan Peers. It was shot at Paramount's Astoria Studios in Astoria, New York, during the early years of sound films. The film is notable as one of the few films of its time to break free from the restrictions of bulky sound technology equipment in order to shoot on location around Manhattan. In 2006, Applause was included in the annual selection of 25 motion pictures added to the National Film Registry of the Library of Congress. being deemed "culturally, historically, or aesthetically significant" and recommended for preservation.

Production background
Based on a novel by Beth Brown, the film was staged and directed by Rouben Mamoulian,  and stars Helen Morgan, Joan Peers, Jack Cameron, Henry Wadsworth, and Fuller Mellish Jr. Mae West was originally considered for the part of Kitty Darling, but Paramount decided West's glamorous stage presence would undercut the tackier aspects of the storyline.

The National Board of Review named Applause one of the 10 best films of 1929.

This was Morgan's first all-talking film. She had previously appeared in the sound prologue to the part-talkie version of Show Boat, released by Universal Studios. In the same year, Morgan appeared in Applause, and Glorifying the American Girl.

In 2006, Applause was selected for preservation in the United States National Film Registry by the Library of Congress as being "culturally, historically, or aesthetically significant".

Plot
The first scene has a marching band playing Theodore Mentz's "A Hot Time in the Old Town".

The film tells of Kitty Darling (Helen Morgan), a burlesque star. Upon the recommendation of burlesque clown and suitor, Joe King (Jack Cameron), Kitty sends her young daughter to a convent to get her away from the sleazy burlesque environment she is involved in.

Many years later, Kitty is not doing so well and her best days are behind her. She is now an alcoholic who lives in the past. She lives with a burlesque comic named Hitch (Fuller Mellish Jr.). Hitch cheats on her and only cares about spending what little money she has. When he finds out that she has been paying for her daughter's convent education for over a decade, he pushes her into bringing April back home.

Her grown, but naive daughter April (Joan Peers) returns. Kitty is embarrassed by her condition and marries Hitch so that April will not be ashamed of her.

When April arrives, she is disgusted with her mother and her sad life. Hitch tries to force her into show business and repeatedly gropes her, at one point forcing a kiss on her.

April roams the city and meets a lonely young sailor named Tony (Henry Wadsworth). They fall in love and agree to marry and April will move to his home in Wisconsin. When April goes to tell her mother about their plans she overhears Hitch belittling Kitty, calling her a "has-been."

April is upset and calls off her wedding.  She decides to join the chorus line of a burlesque show. She says a reluctant goodbye to Tony at the subway. Meanwhile, Kitty takes an overdose of sleeping pills. The bottle clearly says "For insomnia one tablet only".  She goes downstairs to the show and collapses on a couch.

Knowing that Kitty cannot perform in the show, the producer berates her, mistaking her reaction to the overdose for delirium tremens. April, also not realizing what is happening, and over Kitty's objections, says she will take Kitty's place. She tells Kitty she will take care of her now, like Kitty always did for April. As April goes onstage, Kitty passes away, her head hanging over the edge of the couch.

April is disgusted at herself and cannot complete the show. As she runs off the stage, none other than Tony is there to greet her. He says he had a feeling she did not mean what she was saying. She hugs him close and says she wants to go far away. Not realizing Kitty is dead, she says they will need to take care of her mother too, and Tony agrees.

The final shot is a close-up of the Kitty Darling poster on the wall, behind Tony and April.

Cast

Censors

The censor boards approved of the message and production values of the film, but were concerned about a scene in which Kitty told April that two of the chorus girls in the show were Catholic, "as good Catholics as anybody even if they do shake for a living." The line was changed to "Christians".

Censors in Ohio, British Columbia, and Worcester, Massachusetts, banned the film outright. Many cuts were made for showings in cities such as Chicago, Providence, Rhode Island, and St. Louis, Missouri.

Critical reception
The film opened to mixed reviews from film critics.

Critic Mordaunt Hall, writing for The New York Times, liked the acting but was troubled by some of Rouben Mamoulian's direction. He said, "The opening chapters are none too interesting and subsequently one anticipates pretty much what's going to happen...however, Mr. Mamoulian commits the unpardonable sin of being far too extravagant. He becomes tedious in his scenes of the convent and there is nothing but viciousness in his stage passages."

Photoplay described the film as "a curious one", however recommendable for the performances by Morgan and Joan Peers. The anonymous reviewer, however, thought the two leads, "and some nice camera work, help save a confusing job."

The Library of Congress says the following about the film:
Many have compared Mamoulian's debut to that of Orson Welles' Citizen Kane because of his flamboyant use of cinematic innovation to test technical boundaries. The tear-jerking plot boasts top performances from Morgan as the fading burlesque queen, Fuller Mellish Jr. as her slimy paramour and Joan Peers as her cultured daughter. However, the film is remembered today chiefly for Mamoulian's audacious style. While most films of the era were static and stage-bound, Mamoulian's camera reinvigorated the melodramatic plot by prowling relentlessly through sordid backstage life.

A recent review by Manuel Cintra Ferreira highlights the innovative direction and influence on the productions to come:
It is well-known that the arrival of sound brought a revolution in film-making. But (...) the early times were marked by disorientation on how to master the new technique. The cinematographic idiom, having reached a splendorous high by those years, was made to regress almost to its early stages by the demands of the complicated sound machinery, still cameras restricted to the recording of long dialogue declamations in tedious closeups, such that some commentators did not anticipate a sustained future for the "talkies". Mamoulian's role in inverting the slippage was profound, eventually making sound and talk an essential element of the narrative in cinema. Applause, his first work in Hollywood, is from the outset an inescapable witness of this process of change, exploring voice off and sound overlay, which, at the time, technicians considered impossible. (...) Applause became (...) the true "first great sound picture in the world".

Premiere and boxoffice reception
The film opened strongly on October 7, 1929, at New York City's Criterion Theatre, which was celebrating its 35th anniversary. Also on hand was a short film in which Charles K. Harris sang his classic song "After the Ball".

A combination of mixed reviews, misleading advertising (the publicity focused on glamour shots of Helen Morgan, not what she looked like in the film), downbeat subject matter, and the Stock Market Crash caused the movie to taper off significantly as soon as it left the Criterion.

Revival, restoration, and home video release
In 1939, Henry Hathaway nearly remade the film with Marlene Dietrich. Applause was rediscovered in the early 1960s, and there was talk of a stage musical with Judy Garland as Kitty and Liza Minnelli as April.  (The musical Applause, based on the 1950 movie All About Eve, and having absolutely no relation to the 1929 film, opened on March 30, 1970, starring Lauren Bacall.)
The film was restored by the UCLA Film and Television Archive with the original Technicolor sequences.
The film was released on DVD in 2003 through Kino Video (under license from current rightsholders Universal Studios). Special features included comments Rouben Mamoulian made for the 1986 50th anniversary of the Directors Guild of America, censorship notes, a 1929 interview with Mamoulian, rare photos and promotional materials, 1933 newsreel footage of Helen Morgan and her second husband, a clip of Morgan singing "What Wouldn't I Do for That Man?" in the 1929 musical Glorifying the American Girl, excerpts from the Beth Brown novel, and essays on Morgan and the film, written by Christopher S. Connelly.

See also
 List of American films of 1929

References

External links
 
 
 
 
 Applause at Virtual History
Lobby poster for Applause
Applause essay by Daniel Eagan in America's Film Legacy: The Authoritative Guide to the Landmark Movies in the National Film Registry, A&C Black, 2010 , pages 164-166 

1929 films
1920s English-language films
Films set in New York City
Films shot at Astoria Studios
Paramount Pictures films
United States National Film Registry films
Films directed by Rouben Mamoulian
1929 musical films
Films produced by Walter Wanger
American black-and-white films
American musical films
Films with screenplays by Garrett Fort
Films based on novels
1920s American films